The Maremmano-Abruzzese Sheepdog,, also called  Maremmano,  the Maremma Sheepdog or Abruzzese Sheepdog, and Cane da Pastore Abruzzese   or Pastore Abruzzese (Abruzzese Sheepdog and Abruzzese Shepherd, respectively) is an Italian breed of livestock guardian dog from Abruzzo. It is  frequently described as a “gentle giant” due to its large size and passive and gentle nature (and also due to its Abruzzese origin, as residents of Abruzzo are known stereotypically as “strong but kind”,  a descriptor utilized by Primo Levi). It is indigenous to central Italy and northern areas of Southern Italy, particularly to Abruzzo and to the Maremma region of Tuscany and Lazio. It has been used for centuries by Italian shepherds to guard sheep from wolves. The literal English translation of the name is "shepherd dog of the Maremma and Abruzzo". The English name of the breed derives from that of the Maremma marshlands where, until recently, shepherds, dogs and hundreds of thousands of sheep over-wintered, and where the dogs are still abundant although sheep-farming has decreased substantially. It is widely employed in Abruzzo, where sheep herding remains vital to the rural economy and the wolf remains an active and protected predator.

It may share a common ancestor with other breeds of similar appearance including the Pyrenean Mountain Dog, the Kuvasz of Hungary, the Polish Tatra Sheepdog, the Slovenský Cuvac of Slovakia, the Šarplaninac (although that is not white), and to the Akbash of Turkey.

History

Ancient history and iconography
Descriptions of white flock guardian dogs are found in ancient Roman literature, in works such as those of Columella, Varro and Palladius. Similar dogs are depicted in numerous sculptures and paintings from Roman times to the present. Among the earliest is the series of large statues (two in Rome, one in Florence, one – the Duncombe Dog – in England) copied from a Hellenistic bronze from Pergamon.

Iconographic sources identified as relevant to the history of the Maremmano include:
 A Hellenistic bas-relief, of which a drawing was published by Max von Stephanitz in 1901
 A votive statuette in the Museo Archeologico of Capua
 A 14th-century mediaeval fresco in the church of San Francesco in Amatrice, at the foot of the Monti della Laga, in the comune of Rieti; the dog wears a roccale
 A 14th-century fresco in Santa Maria Novella, in Florence
 A 'Nativity' of Mariotto di Nardo (active 1394–1424); the dog wears a spiked collar
 Abraham and Lot on their way into Canaan by Bartolo Battiloro, in the Collegiata of San Gimignano
 A detail of the Journey of the Magi to Bethlehem by Benozzo Gozzoli, c.1460
 Rough ink drawings on the maps of the pasture-lands of the Tavoliere di Foggia published in 1686 by Antonio and Nunzio Michele di Rovere
 A seventeenth-century engraving of the Roman campagna by Joannes van den Hecke
 An eighteenth-century maiolica of a bear-hunt by Candeloro Cappelletti (1689–1772) of Castelli, Abruzzo
 Hunting the Wolf by Jean-Baptiste Oudry, 1746, from the collection of Louis XV; the dogs to the left and right of the wolf are described in a catalogue of the museum as "large dog[s] with long hair". Wolf dogs from the Abruzzo were imported into France at about this time. They were used by François Antoine, "Antoine de Beauterne", in his successful hunt for the Beast of Gévaudan in 1765; according to Gobin, under Louis XV (r.1715–1774) the Venerie Royale or Royal Hunt was composed in large part of Abruzzese wolf-dogs and Sicilian mastiffs.
 The cane da lupo or wolf-dog used by Vincenzo Dandolo to defend Spanish sheep on the mountains above Varese
 An illustration in The Penny Magazine (1833)
 An engraving by Arthur John Strutt of a shepherd and his dog in the Roman campagna in 1843
 Several engravings by Charles Coleman in his collection A Series of Subjects peculiar to the Campagna of Rome and Pontine Marshes

Recent history

The first registration of the Maremmano in the Libro delle Origini Italiano of the Kennel Club Italiano, as it was then called, was of four dogs in 1898. There were no further registrations for many years. In 1940 there were 17 dogs registered. The first standard for the breed was drawn up in 1924 by Luigi Groppi and Giuseppe Solaro.

Until 1958 the Pastore Maremmano, or shepherd dog of the Maremma, and the Pastore Abruzzese, or shepherd dog of the Abruzzi, were regarded as separate breeds. A breeder's society for the Pastore Abruzzese was formed in 1950, and one for the Maremmano in 1953. On 1 January 1958 the breeds were unified by the ENCI, the Ente Nazionale della Cinofilia Italiano, the national dog association of Italy. The explanation given is that a "natural fusion" of the two types had occurred as a result of movement of the dogs due to transhumance of sheep flocks from one region to another, particularly after the unification of Italy. Until 1860, the mountains of the Abruzzo and the plains of the Maremma lay in different countries. While some older publications refer to the Maremmano and Abruzzese as independent breeds combined to create the Maremmano-Abruzzese, it has been noted that the shorter-haired Maremmano was only ever observed during the winter months, when flocks were grazed on their winter pastures on the milder coastal Tuscany, whilst the supposedly longer-bodied Abruzzese was only observed in the summer months, when flocks were grazed in the Abruzzi mountains.

As sheep farming developed into an annual trek or transhumance from mountain grasslands of Abruzzo and Molise (and other parts of central Italy) south to lower pasture land in Puglia, where sheep were over-wintered, the dogs came to play a central role in the centuries-old migration, an annual event vital to Abruzzese culture. Maremmano dogs continue to be widely used by Italian sheep farmers in areas where predation is common, such as the Apennines of central Italy and the open range land of national parks in Abruzzo. The dogs have also been used to guard animals in Australia, Canada and the United States.

Characteristics 
The Maremmano has a solid, muscular build, a thick white coat, a large head and a black nose. According to the breed standard, males should weigh  and stand  at the shoulder, while females weigh  and stand . Some dogs may be considerably larger. The coat is long and thick; it is rough to the touch, and forms a thick collar around the neck. It should be solid white; some minor yellowing may be tolerated.

Some divide the breed into various subtypes, largely based on small differences in physical attributes and with subtype names based on village and provincial names where the dogs may be found, e.g. the Maremmano, the Marsicano, the Aquilano, the Pescocostanzo, the Maiella, and the Peligno. However, biologists dispute this division, as well as over-reliance on minor physical differences, as the dogs were bred over the centuries for their behavioral characteristics as flock guardians.

Use

The traditional use of the Maremmano is as a guardian for the protection of sheep flocks against wolves. Columella, writing in the first century AD, recommends white dogs for this purpose, as the shepherd can easily distinguish them from the wolf, while Varro suggests that white dogs have a "lion-like aspect" in the dark. The dogs work in groups; three or four dogs are an adequate defense against wolves and stray dogs. Their function is mostly one of dissuasion, actual physical combat with the predator being relatively rare. Nevertheless, working dogs may be fitted with a roccale (or vreccale), a spiked iron collar which protects the neck in combat. The ears of working dogs are normally cropped.

Dogs used for flock protection are placed among the sheep as young puppies – no more than 40 days old – so that they bond with them; human contact is kept to the indispensable minimum. If there are already guardian dogs in the flock, the puppy imitates and learns from their behaviour. The traditional use of the Maremmano is with sheep, but the dogs can form a similar bond with cattle and have been used to protect them. A small number have been used since 2006 on Middle Island, off Warrnambool, in Victoria, Australia, to protect a small population of the little penguin (Eudyptula minor) against invasive foxes. In Patagonia they have been used to protect sheep from pumas.

References

FCI breeds
Dog breeds originating in Italy
Livestock guardian dogs